Bhurud River is a river in western India in Gujarat whose origin is Near Chavdka Adhochhni village. Its basin has a maximum length of 50 km. The total catchment area of the basin is 326 km2.

References

Rivers of Gujarat
Rivers of India